Brian Dean Hansen (born October 20, 1960) is a former American football punter in the National Football League.

Biography
Hansen was born in Hawarden, Iowa, and graduated from West Sioux High School. Hansen played college football at the University of Sioux Falls and was drafted in the ninth round of the 1984 NFL Draft with the 237th overall pick. While attending the University of Sioux Falls, Hansen earned First-team All-American honors.

He played from 1984 to 1999 for the New Orleans Saints,  the New England Patriots, the Cleveland Browns, the New York Jets, and the Washington Redskins. He was selected to the 1984 Pro Bowl.  

Hansen is currently the South Dakota state director for Fellowship of Christian Athletes (FCA) in Sioux Falls, South Dakota. Hansen and his wife, Lauri, have three children.

References

External links
 http://www.southdakotafca.org/
 http://www.footballdb.com/players/brian-hansen-hansebr01

1960 births
Living people
People from Hawarden, Iowa
American football punters
University of Sioux Falls people
New Orleans Saints players
New England Patriots players
Cleveland Browns players
New York Jets players
Washington Redskins players
National Conference Pro Bowl players